Datuk Mohammad Said bin Yusof (born 15 September 1959) was a member of the Malaysian Parliament in the lower house of the Dewan Rakyat, representing the constituency of Jasin in the state of Malacca. He is a member of the United Malays National Organisation (UMNO), the leading party of the governing Barisan Nasional (BN) coalition.

After the dissolution of Parliament on 13 February 2008, Mohammad Said was dropped by BN as a candidate for the seat of Jasin in the 2008 general election, to be replaced by another UMNO-affiliated member, Ahmad Hamzah.

Controversies

Illegal timber exports 
In May 2006, a scandal arose over an MP who allegedly asked the Malaccan Customs and Excise Department for special treatment in the handling of an illegal timber import shipment from Indonesia. After the New Straits Times publicised the issue, Parliamentary Leader of the Opposition Lim Kit Siang from the Democratic Action Party (DAP) moved to refer the issue to the Dewan Rakyat House Rights and Privileges Committee. After the motion failed, the Chairman of the Barisan Nasional Backbenchers Club (BNBBC), Shahrir Abdul Samad, announced his resignation as a matter of principle.

Shortly after, Said announced he was the MP implicated in the scandal. However, he said he had only requested leniency in the case concerned, as the shipment had been confiscated on the basis of a technicality. Although the diameter of the logs concerned exceeded the maximum limit of 152.4 centimetres, Said requested leniency on the behalf of one of his constituents, because the logs had been partially hollowed out. The Department rejected Said's request to simply compound the shipment. Said later told the press that although he felt the decision was right, some discretion should have been exercised to aid the Bumiputra entrepreneur whose interests were affected.

On 10 May 2006, following an exposé by the New Straits Times, Said admitted that the company he was trying to help in the log scandal was in fact his own company, Binyu Sof Enterprise.

"Bocor" remark 
In a 9 May 2007 Parliament session, Mohammad Said supported Kinabatangan MP Datuk Bung Mokhtar Radin, who made sexist remarks referencing menstruation against Fong Po Kuan, a female Batu Gajah MP from the Democratic Action Party. The incident occurred during a heated argument with Fong over ceiling leakages in the Parliament Houses, accumulating to both men stating the following in Malay:

Both Mohammad Said and Bung Mokhtar's remark led to an uproar among women's groups. The two MPs would later issue a "public apology" to women "who might have been offended" by their words during a meeting with Women, Family and Community Development Minister Shahrizat Abdul Jalil on 18 May 2007.

Notes and references

Living people
1959 births
Members of the Dewan Rakyat
Malaysian people of Malay descent
Malaysian Muslims
United Malays National Organisation politicians